Nicholas "Nick" Talley  FRACP, FAFPHM, FRCP (Lond), FRCP (Edin), FACP, FACG, AGAF, FAHMS is an Australian gastroenterologist, epidemiologist, researcher, and clinical educator.

Early life

Talley grew up in Sydney, Australia. He is a first-generation Australian and the son of a Hungarian gastroenterologist, also known as Nicholas Talley OAM FRACP.

Education and training
Talley studied medicine at the University of New South Wales, graduating in 1979 with honours. He undertook postgraduate training in internal medicine, following in his father's footsteps and becoming a gastroenterologist. Interested in research, Talley received a National Health and Medical Research Council scholarship in 1984.

Talley performed his medical training at Prince of Wales Hospital in Sydney, Royal North Shore Hospital in Sydney, and Mayo Clinic in Rochester, Minnesota.

Professional career
In 1988, Talley was appointed to the consultant staff at Mayo Clinic in Minnesota. In 1993, Talley returned to Australia to become the Foundation Professor of Medicine at Nepean Hospital in Sydney. In 2002, Talley returned to the Mayo Clinic in Minnesota to become the Co-Director of the Center for Enteric Neurosciences Translational and Epidemiological Research Program.  During this time at the Mayo Clinic, Talley also served as a professor of medicine.  In 2006, he also became a professor of epidemiology. In 2007, Talley was appointed the Chairman of Medicine at the Mayo Clinic campus in Jacksonville, Florida.

In 2010, Talley returned to Australia to become Pro Vice Chancellor, Faculty of Health and Medicine at the University of Newcastle in Newcastle, New South Wales. 2013-14 Talley served as Deputy Vice-Chancellor, Research and Innovation, at the same university. . Talley also practices as a gastroenterologist at the John Hunter Hospital in New Lambton Heights, New South Wales.

Talley is Ex-President of the Royal Australasian College of Physicians 2014–2016. And past Chair of the Council of Presidents of Medical Colleges, Australia from 2015–2017. He is the current Editor-in-chief of The Medical Journal of Australia.

Australia Day 2018, he was awarded the Companion of the Order of Australia (AC) "For eminent service to medical research, and to education in the field of gastroenterology and epidemiology, as an academic, author and administrator at the national and international level, and to health and scientific associations".

In 2018, he received a further two prestigious awards for his work in Science:
NSW Scientist of the Year Award, Sydney Australia - presented in November 2018 by the NSW Premier.
Research Australia, Peter Wills Medal, Sydney Australia - presented in November 2018 by Peter Wills himself.

Research
Talley's research interests are in neurogastroenterology; including the treatment, pathophysiology and epidemiology of functional dyspepsia and irritable bowel syndrome; he is considered an international authority in the field. Talley also has a strong interest in gastrointestinal complications in diabetes.

Talley has published over 100 research papers.  He was a member of the Rome Foundation Board for 17 years (the authority in the classification of all the functional GI disorders).  Talley is a past editor of Alimentary Pharmacology and Therapeutics, and former editor of the American Journal of Gastroenterology.  In 2015 Talley was appointed editor-in-chief of the Medical Journal of Australia.

Talley is the principal investigator on an extensive research portfolio, including a large multi-center National Institute of Health funded randomized controlled trial in functional dyspepsia (UO1). He is also a chief investigator on multiple NIH project grants.

Education

Talley and Dr. Simon O'Connor co-authored Clinical Examination,  a widely used textbook of physical examination.  Talley and O'Connor wrote this book because many of the existing textbooks omitted useful clinical examination techniques.   Talley and O'Connor also wrote the widely acclaimed Examination Medicine for postgraduate trainees.

Talley  wrote the textbook Internal Medicine: The Essential Facts. He is also the author of a textbook of gastroenterology, now in its third edition.

References

Living people
21st-century Australian mathematicians
Australian textbook writers
Australian gastroenterologists
Australian medical researchers
Year of birth missing (living people)
Medical doctors from Sydney
Companions of the Order of Australia
Fellows of the Royal Australasian College of Physicians
Medical journal editors